Sander Heesakkers (born 8 January 1995) is a Dutch footballer who plays as a left back for EVV Eindhoven in the Dutch Topklasse.

Career

Heesakkers made his professional debut as Jong PSV player in the Jupiler League on 30 September 2013 in a 2-1 home win against Jong Twente. In his debut season, he played 11 league games.

References

External links

1995 births
Living people
Dutch footballers
Netherlands youth international footballers
Eerste Divisie players
Tweede Divisie players
PSV Eindhoven players
K.F.C. Dessel Sport players
Kozakken Boys players
Sportspeople from 's-Hertogenbosch
Footballers from North Brabant
Association football fullbacks